Bofilliella subarcuata is a species of small, very elongate, air-breathing land snails, terrestrial pulmonate gastropod mollusks in the family Clausiliidae, the door snails, all of which have a clausilium.

This species is found in France and Spain.

References

Bofilliella
Gastropods described in 1897
Taxonomy articles created by Polbot